Chowdhury Abd-Allah Zaheeruddin (1903 – 1967), or Lal Mia, as he is commonly referred to, was a prominent Bengali politician in the Indian National Congress or the Congress Party and later the Muslim League.

Career 
Chowdhry studied at the Aligarh Muslim University. He was involved in the Khilafat Movement in British India and was jailed by the British Raj. He joined the Muslim League in 1943. He was the minister of Health, Labor and Social welfare of Pakistan in 1965.

Chowdhury was a Member of the 3rd National Assembly of Pakistan representing Faridpur-1. He was a Member of the  4th National Assembly of Pakistan representing Faridpur-1.

References 

1969 deaths
1903 births
Aligarh Muslim University alumni
Bengali politicians
Indian National Congress politicians
All India Muslim League members
Pakistani MNAs 1965–1969
Pakistani MNAs 1962–1965